Eleanor Patterson (born 22 May 1996) is an Australian track and field athlete who competes in the high jump. She is the reigning world champion, jumping an Australian record of 2.02m in Eugene, Oregon on 19 July 2022.  Having qualified for the 2020 Tokyo Olympics, she jumped 1.95m in her group and therefore qualified for the final. Here she managed 1.96m for a fifth-place finish, 0.08m behind the eventual winner, Mariya Lasitskene, ROC.

She is the joint holder of the world youth best and the outright holder of the Oceanian junior record. She was the gold medallist at the 2014 Commonwealth Games and the 2013 World Youth Championships in Athletics.

Career
Born in Leongatha, Victoria, Patterson began competing in the high jump as a child. She went to Little Athletics with her friend and fell in love with the sport. Patterson competed in many local events. She returned the following year to win that title and improved to  that November.

Patterson was regularly over 1.90 m in the 2014 season, winning a fourth straight Australian junior title and taking her first senior national title at the Australian Athletics Championships. She decided to miss the 2014 World Junior Championships in Athletics in order to represent Australia at the 2014 Commonwealth Games instead. The move paid off as she jumped  to win the gold medal ahead of England's Isobel Pooley. This made the 18-year-old the third youngest Australian Commonwealth Games champion ever.

Patterson didn't make the 2018 Commonwealth Games squad, took a year off the sport, before returning and qualifying for the Tokyo 2020 Olympics.

In 2020 she set a new Australian record, jumping 1.99m in New Zealand.

In 2022 she set a new Oceania Indoor record, jumping 2.00 in Belgrade.

On July 19, 2022 she tied the Australian National Record and won gold at the World Athletics Championship in Eugene, Oregon by jumping 2.02m. 

Patterson is the fiancée of Italian high jumper Marco Fassinotti.

References

External links

Living people
1996 births
Athletes (track and field) at the 2014 Commonwealth Games
Athletes (track and field) at the 2022 Commonwealth Games
Australian female high jumpers
Commonwealth Games gold medallists for Australia
Commonwealth Games silver medallists for Australia
Sportswomen from Victoria (Australia)
World Athletics Championships athletes for Australia
Athletes (track and field) at the 2016 Summer Olympics
Olympic athletes of Australia
Commonwealth Games medallists in athletics
People from Leongatha
Athletes (track and field) at the 2020 Summer Olympics
World Athletics Indoor Championships medalists
20th-century Australian women
21st-century Australian women
Medallists at the 2022 Commonwealth Games